Cosmonaut is the sixth studio album by Bump of Chicken, released on December 15, 2010. The album features the singles "R.I.P./Merry Christmas" (without "Merry Christmas"), "Happy", "Mahō no Ryōri ~Kimi Kara Kimi e~", and "Uchūhikōshi e no Tegami/Motorcycle".

Track listing

Charts

References

2010 albums
Bump of Chicken albums
Japanese-language albums